Moquihuix (or Moquihuixtli) (died 1473) was the fourth tlatoani (ruler) of Tlatelolco. He died in 1473 in the Battle of Tlatelolco, a military conflict fought between Tlatelolco and Tenochtitlan.

Moquihuix was married to Chalchiuhnenetzin, younger sister of the Tenochca ruler Axayacatl, after whom their son Axayaca was named. However, it is said that Moquihuix neglected Chalchiuhnenetzin, preferring the company of other women.

A funerary urn that may belong to Moquihuix was found in 1978 at the site of the Templo Mayor of Tenochtitlan, near the Coyolxauhqui Stone.

Notes

References

15th-century births
1473 deaths
Year of birth unknown
Tlatoque of Tlatelolco